Philippe Joseph Martin (born January 18, 1966) is a French Professor of Economics at Sciences Po in Paris. He currently serves as chair of the French Council of Economic Analysis. He is the Vice President and a research fellow at the London-based CEPR (Centre for Economic Policy Research).

Career
Martin previously taught at the Graduate Institute of International Studies, the University of Paris 1 Pantheon-Sorbonne and the Paris School of Economics. From 2001 to 2002, he served as an economist at the Federal Reserve Bank of New York.

Martin's research focuses on international trade and macroeconomics, in addition to economic geography. He was the economic advisor (2015-2016) of Emmanuel Macron when he was Minister of the Economy.

Other activities
 Cercle des économistes, Member

Political positions
Ahead of the 2012 French presidential election, Martin co-signed an appeal of several economists in support of candidate François Hollande. In 2017, he advised Emmanuel Macron on his economic programme during his presidential campaign.

Recognition
 2002 – Prix du meilleur jeune économiste de France (shared with Thomas Piketty)

References

External links 
 

1966 births
Living people
French economists
Georgetown University alumni
Academic staff of the University of Paris
Academic staff of the Graduate Institute of International and Development Studies